Ambani is a surname and may refer to the following people:

Some people of Ambani surname 

 Anil Ambani, an Indian businessman and chairman of Reliance Group
 Dhirubhai Ambani, an Indian businessman and founder of Reliance Industries in Mumbai
 Mukesh Ambani, an Indian businessman and largest shareholder of Reliance Industries; one of the richest persons in India 
 Nita Ambani, reportedly India's wealthiest woman, chairperson and founder of Reliance Foundation, founder of Dhirubhai Ambani International School (DAIS) and a non-executive director of Reliance Industries
 Tina Ambani, a former Indian actress and chairman of Reliance Anil Dhirubhai Ambani Group, founder of Kokilaben Dhirubhai Ambani Hospital (KDAH); actively involved in many foundations and charities

Gujarati-language surnames